Equil 2 is a computer program used to estimate the risk of nephrolithiasis (renal stones). The input data includes excretion, concentration, and the saturation of trace elements or other substances which are involved in the creation of kidney stones and the output will be provided in terms of PSF score (probability of stone formation) or other equivalent formats. In some studies SUPERSAT, another program, provided more accurate measurements in some of the parameters such as relative supersaturation (RSS).

References

Kidney diseases
Medical software